The Albanian–Yugoslav conflict or Yugoslav armed uprising in Albania, was a secret Yugoslav paramilitary operation in Albania with the main goal of uncovering Albanian propaganda and information and overthrowing the government of Enver Hoxha to protect Yugoslavia from a possible invasion by Albania.

Background 
After the paramilitary Operation Valuable, Yugoslavia decided to continue their operation to prevent itself from going to war with Albania. They sent Yugoslav Army agents to Albania to check the situation there

In 1949 the Albanian–Yugoslav conflict widened considerably and came close to a possible war. Enver Hoxha sought to concentrate the entire state and political apparatus of Albania on 'the unmasking of the bourgeois and anti-communist policy of Yugoslavia'. The information and propaganda disseminated by both countries changed accordingly.

Operation 
In 1950 the Yugoslav Agent Forces were supposed to recruit the Tito clique made up of Serbs, Albanian Royalists and Greek volunteers and get them ready for the mission.

In 1951, three Yugoslav army divisions were deployed to the Albanian border area, one near Podgorica, a motorized division in Skopje and another between Dibra and Ohrid. The Albanian authorities were alerted and subsequently arrested more than 150 people(responsible Yugoslav agents) who were considered dangerous or suspicious in the border areas with Yugoslavia. They recruited a total of 3600 men for this operation, they also called the agents either Tito's agents or Tito's soldiers

The mission of Tito's agents/soldiers was to overthrow the regime in Albania by releasing propaganda documents, bringing information to Yugoslavia and exposing the situation in Albania. The Yugoslav forces were assisted with equipment by the CIA.

Borderline tensions
In 1948, after UDBA sent its agents to Albania, their agents were all caught. The Yugoslav UDBA still tried to protect their agents but they were arrested by the Albanian border guards and the Yugoslavs of the UDBA were tortured and their heads were beaten up with chairs by the Sigurimi. In 1948, after the conflict was spreading, Albanian border guard soldiers decided to take revenge. They invaded Yugoslav territory with 225 Albanian soldiers and attacked Yugoslav soldiers and citizens, killing 10 Yugoslav soldiers, wounding 15 Yugoslav citizens and kidnapping 3 UDBA agents.

Aftermath 
Many of the soldiers were either bugged, captured and sent to labor camps or to court and charged with a death penalty.

References 

Military history of Albania
Geopolitical rivalry
1950s conflicts
Albania–Yugoslavia relations
Socialist Federal Republic of Yugoslavia